Steven Wagner (born November 5, 1967 in Philadelphia) is a former field hockey goalkeeper from the United States, who finished 12th with the men's national team at the 1996 Summer Olympics in Atlanta, Georgia.

References
US Field Hockey

External links
 

1967 births
Living people
American male field hockey players
Olympic field hockey players of the United States
Field hockey players at the 1996 Summer Olympics
Field hockey players from Philadelphia
Pan American Games bronze medalists for the United States
Pan American Games medalists in field hockey
Field hockey players at the 1995 Pan American Games
Medalists at the 1995 Pan American Games